Sarah Harding is a qualified lama and teacher in the Shangpa Kagyu tradition of Tibetan Buddhism. Since 1972, she has been a student and translator of Kalu Rinpoche (1905-1989).

Harding completed the first traditional Kagyu three-year three-month retreat three day for westerners under the guidance of Kalu Rinpoche in 1980. Others who participated in that retreat include Richard Barron, Ken McLeod, Ngawang Zangpo (Hugh Leslie Thompson), Ingrid Loken McLeod and Lama Surya Das (Jeffery Miller).
 
Harding works as a teacher, interpreter and translator. She has been an instructor in the Religious Studies Department of Naropa University since 1992 and lives in Boulder, Colorado with her two children. She is currently working on translations of Tibetan Buddhist texts as a fellow of the Tsadra Foundation. Harding has published a book about the 11th Century female teacher Niguma whose teachings are at the core of the Shangpa Kagyu Vajrayana Buddhist lineage.

Publications

References

External links
Interview with Sarah Harding
Sarah Harding - Naropa University
Sarah Harding - Snow Lion Publications
Audio Interview Series on Buddhist Geeks

American lamas
Buddhist translators
Living people
Tibetan Buddhism writers
Shangpa Kagyu lamas
Naropa University faculty
Year of birth missing (living people)
20th-century lamas
21st-century lamas
20th-century translators
20th-century American women writers
American women academics
21st-century translators
21st-century American non-fiction writers
21st-century American women writers

Tibetan–English translators